Tariq Ahmed Issa (born 2 September 1997) is an English footballer who plays as a forward for Needham Market.

Issa joined Colchester United's Academy at the age of 12 from Trinity Football Club based in Southend-on-Sea. He made his professional debut for the club in 2016. In August 2018, he joined Needham Market on loan. He also had a loan spell at Maldon & Tiptree in 2019. He was released by Colchester in July 2020. Issa rejoined Needham on a permanent basis in 2021.

Career
Issa joined the Colchester United Academy at the age of 12 from Trinity Football Club in Southend-on-Sea. He broke into Colchester's under-18 side while still an under-16 player, and was the first Colchester Academy player to come through the educational system associated with Thurstable School in Tiptree. He and teammate Cameron James signed four-year contracts with the club in July 2015, before agreeing a new four-year deal in July 2016.

Issa made his first-team debut in the EFL Trophy on 4 October 2016, replacing Dion Sembie-Ferris at half-time in Colchester's 2–1 defeat to Southampton U23. He made his English Football League debut on 19 August 2017 as a substitute for Drey Wright in Colchester's 3–0 defeat against Luton Town.

On 30 August 2018, Issa signed for Southern League Premier Division Central side Needham Market on loan until January 2019. He made his debut on 1 September as a half-time substitute in Needham's 3–0 defeat at Alvechurch.

In August and September 2019, Issa made seven appearances on loan for Isthmian League North Division side Maldon & Tiptree. However, in October 2019 it was reported he had suffered a knee injury that would require surgery.

Issa was one of 16 players to be released by Colchester United in summer 2020.

In July 2021, Issa signed for Needham Market on a permanent basis.

Career statistics

References

External links

1997 births
Living people
English footballers
Association football forwards
Colchester United F.C. players
Needham Market F.C. players
Maldon & Tiptree F.C. players
English Football League players
Southern Football League players
Isthmian League players